State Highway 114 (SH 114) is a  long state highway in southern central Colorado. SH 114's western terminus is at U.S. Route 50 (US 50) east of Gunnison, and the eastern terminus is at US 285 in Saguache.

Route description
SH 114 begins in the west at its junction with US 50 approximately eight miles east of Gunnison. At North Pass the road crosses into Rio Grande National Forest through which it passes generally eastward for roughly four and a half miles before leaving National Forest Service land and continuing for a further twenty-six miles before reaching Saguache at the northern edge of the San Luis Valley. There the road finds its eastern terminus at US 285.

History
The route was defined in the 1920s, using a routing over Cochetopa Pass. In 1963, the section over Cochetopa Pass was deleted and North Pass was used instead, paved by 1964.

Major intersections

Gallery

See also

 List of state highways in Colorado

References

External links

114
Transportation in Gunnison County, Colorado
Transportation in Saguache County, Colorado
Gunnison National Forest
Rio Grande National Forest
San Luis Valley of Colorado